Albert Isaac Beach (July 30, 1883 – January 21, 1939) was a Republican mayor of Kansas City, Missouri from 1924 to 1930, the final mayor to be elected before the city adopted the City Manager form of government.

Biography
Beach was born on July 30, 1883, in Olathe, Kansas, the son of George Henry Beach and Eva F. Hull. He graduated from the University of Kansas in 1905, and received his law degree from Washington University School of Law in 1907. Beach married Marjorie Marshall, on December 21, 1907. He was a  Presbyterian. 

He moved to Kansas City in 1908 and was elected to the city council from the fifth ward in 1910 and the fourth ward in 1912. He was elected as mayor of the city in 1924. He would stay in the office until 1930. 

Officially intending to make government more efficient, he backed the a referendum to create the city manager government. 

The first city manager Henry F. McElroy took office in 1926 with the backing of big city boss Thomas Pendergast.  McElroy took over Beach's office and he was relegated to a small office.  The city manager government was to mark the zenith of Pendergast power. 

Beach was delegate of the Republican National Convention from Missouri in 1928. 

He was member of the American Bar Association; Beta Theta Pi; Phi Delta Phi; Freemasons. 

Beach died at his home in Kansas City, Jackson County, Missouri on January 21, 1939, from coronary thrombosis. He was buried at Forest Hill Calvary Cemetery in Kansas City.

Notable events during his tenure included:
Construction of Kansas City Downtown Airport
Construction of a hospital on Hospital Hill

References

Kansas City Public Library History

1883 births
1939 deaths
Politicians from Olathe, Kansas
University of Kansas alumni
Washington University School of Law alumni
Missouri lawyers
Mayors of Kansas City, Missouri
Missouri Republicans
20th-century American politicians